Justin Tyrell Harrell (born February 14, 1984) is a former American football player. He was drafted by the Green Bay Packers 16th overall in the 2007 NFL Draft and was part of their Super Bowl XLV championship against the Pittsburgh Steelers. He played college football at Tennessee.

Early years

Harrell was named the 2A Mr. Football in Tennessee and was named All-American by PrepStar recruiting service. During his senior season at tight end he caught 18 passes for 354 yards and six touchdowns. Harrell attended Westview High School in Martin, Tennessee where his team was a state runner-up his senior year. He started three years in basketball and averaged 17 points per game. He also started all four years in football.

Professional career

Green Bay Packers
At the 2007 NFL draft he was selected 16th overall by the Green Bay Packers. He was the second defensive tackle taken in the draft after Amobi Okoye (Texans).

Harrell took part in only limited drills with the Packers in their organized team activities (OTA) practices as a result of the torn biceps tendon suffered while playing for Tennessee. Harrell was cleared to practice with the team at the preseason camp which began July 28.  Harrell immediately drew criticism for showing up to OTA and Training Camp his rookie season out of shape and slightly overweight.

On July 27, 2007 Harrell signed a six-year contract with the Packers. The deal reportedly had a maximum value of just under $15 million with approximately $8 million guaranteed. Harrell played in his first NFL game on October 7, 2007 against the Chicago Bears in Week 5.

Harrell spent 2008 training camp on the Active/Physically Unable to Perform (PUP) list. On August 25, he was placed on the Reserve/PUP list, forcing him to miss the first six weeks of the regular season. He was activated on November 1 after defensive end Kabeer Gbaja-Biamila was released.  On August 4, 2009, Harrell again injured his back during training camp practice and was inactive for the entire 2009 season.

In the season opener of the 2010 football season, Harrell suffered a torn ACL and was placed on Injured Reserve, ending his season.

As of the conclusion of the 2010 season, Harrell had participated in just 14 regular season games over four seasons. He was released on July 28, 2011.

References

External links
Green Bay Packers bio
Tennessee Volunteers bio

1984 births
Living people
People from Martin, Tennessee
Players of American football from Tennessee
American football defensive ends
American football defensive tackles
Tennessee Volunteers football players
Green Bay Packers players